

Events 
 January–March 
 January 1 – Anthony van Diemen takes office as Governor-General of the Dutch East Indies (now Indonesia), and will serve until his death in 1645.
 January 18 – The Duke's Mistress, the last play by James Shirley, is given its first performance.
 February 21 – Al Walid ben Zidan, Sultan of Morocco, is assassinated by French renegades.
 February 26 – Nimi a Lukeni a Nzenze a Ntumba is installed as King Alvaro VI of Kongo, in the area now occupied by the African nation of Angola, and rules until his death on February 22, 1641.
 March 5 (February 24 Old Style) – King Christian IV of Denmark and Norway gives an order, that all beggars that are able to work must be sent to Brinholmen, to build ships or to work as galley rowers.
 March 13 (March 3 Old Style) – A "great charter" to the University of Oxford establishes the Oxford University Press, as the second of the privileged presses in England.
 March 26 – Utrecht University is founded in the Dutch Republic.

 April–June 
 April 30 – Eighty Years' War: The nine-month Siege of Schenkenschans ends, when forces of the Dutch Republic recapture the strategically important fort from the Spanish.
 May 14 – William Pynchon and his men establish the settlement of Springfield, Massachusetts Bay Colony (they will deed the land later that year, on July 15th).
 June 20 – Roger Williams and other Puritan settlers become founders of the colony of Providence Plantations, which later joins neighbouring territory to become the colony of Rhode Island and Providence Plantations. The area today is the U.S. state of Rhode Island.
 June 22 – The Battle of Tornavento is fought in north-west Italy in the course of the Thirty Years' War, as France and Savoy respond to an attack by Spain. While the battle is a stalemate, the city of Castano Primo is heavily damaged.

 July–September 
 July 10 – The Senate of the Venetian Republic votes, 82 to 4, in favor of renewing the charter of Jewish merchants to sell within the city, after a delay of almost six months. 
 July 20 – The Pequot War begins in New England when John Oldham and several of his crew are killed when his ship is attacked and robbed, apparently by allies of the Narragansett Indians at Block Island. 
 July 30 – In France, Cardinal Richelieu persuades King Louis XIII to issue an ordonnance excusing the French nobility from military service if they pay a tax which allows the hiring of paid cavalry. 
 August 15 – The Spanish besiege Corbie, France.
 August 25 (August 15 Old Style) – The covenant of the Town of Dedham, Massachusetts Bay Colony is first signed.
 September 18 (September 8 Old Style)  –  A vote of the Great and General Court of the Massachusetts Bay Colony establishes New College (Harvard University), as the first college founded in the United States.

 October–December 
 October 4 (September 24 Old Style) – Thirty Years' War – Battle of Wittstock: A Swedish-allied army defeats a combined Imperial-Saxon army.
 November 5 – English theologian Henry Burton preaches two sermons on Guy Fawkes Day, heavily critical of the Anglican bishops, and is soon summoned before the Star Chamber. 
 December 23 (December 13 Old Style) – The Massachusetts Bay Colony organizes three militia regiments to defend the colony against the Pequot Indians. This organization is recognized today as the founding of the United States National Guard.

 Date unknown 
 Thirty Years' War: French intervention starts.
 Manchus occupy the Liaoning region in north China, select Shenyang (Mukden) as their capital, and proclaim the new Qing dynasty (pure).
 The shōgun forbids Japanese to travel abroad, and those abroad from returning home.
 Emperor Fasilides founds the city of Gondar, which becomes the capital of Ethiopia for the next two centuries.
 The first American ancestor of John Adams, Henry Adams, emigrates to Massachusetts.
 The first synagogue of the New World, Kahal Zur Israel Synagogue, is founded in Recife by the Dutch.

Births

January–March 
 January 1 – Jacques Cassagne, French clergyman (d. 1679)
 January 8 – Fernando de Valenzuela, 1st Marquis of Villasierra, Spanish noble (d. 1692)
 January 12 – Jean-Baptiste Monnoyer, French painter (d. 1699)
 January 20 – Count Maximilian I, Prince of Hohenzollern-Sigmaringen (d. 1689)
 February 6 – Heiman Dullaart, Dutch painter (d. 1684)
 February 12 – Hermann Witsius, Dutch theologian (d. 1708)
 February 16 – Shubael Dummer, American Congregational church minister (d. 1692)
 March 1 – Giacinto Camillo Maradei, Italian Catholic prelate, Bishop of Policastro (d. 1705)
 March 8 – Robert Kerr, 1st Marquess of Lothian (d. 1703)
 March 13 – Ulrik Huber, Dutch philosopher (d. 1694)
 March 25 – Henric Piccardt, Dutch lawyer (d. 1712)

April–June 
 April 6 – Noël Bouton de Chamilly, Marshal of France (d. 1715)
 April 10 – Balthasar Kindermann, German poet (d. 1706)
 April 13 – Hendrik van Rheede, Dutch botanist (d. 1691)
 April 29 – Esaias Reusner, German lutenist and composer (d. 1679)
 May 6 – Laura Mancini, French court beauty (d. 1657)
 May 17 – Edward Colman, English Catholic courtier under Charles II (d. 1678)
 May 22 – Ferdinand Albert I, Duke of Brunswick-Lüneburg (d. 1687)
 May 27 – Thormodus Torfæus, Icelandic historian (d. 1719)
 June 3 – John Hale, Beverly minister (d. 1700)
 June 15
 Sir Thomas Slingsby, 2nd Baronet of England (d. 1688)
 Charles de La Fosse, French painter (d. 1716)
 June 21 – Godefroy Maurice de La Tour d'Auvergne, Duke of Bouillon, French noble (d. 1721)
 June 29 – Thomas Hyde, English orientalist (d. 1703)

July–September 
 July 2 – Daniel Speer, German Baroque composer and writer  (d. 1709)
 July 12 – Count Ferdinand Edzard of East Frisia, German nobleman (d. 1668)
 July 31 – Josias II, Count of Waldeck-Wildungen, major general in Brunswick and co-ruler of Waldeck-Wildungen (d. 1669)
 August 25 – Louis Victor de Rochechouart de Mortemart, French military man, brother of Madame de Montespan (d. 1688)
 September 5 – Ignace-Gaston Pardies, French physicist (d. 1673)
 September 24 – Francesco Vaccaro, Italian painter (d. 1675)
 September 25 – Ferdinand Joseph, Prince of Dietrichstein, German prince (d. 1698)
 September 28 – Sophia Dorothea of Schleswig-Holstein-Sonderburg-Glücksburg, Prussian royal consort (d. 1689)
 September 29 – Thomas Tenison, Archbishop of Canterbury (d. 1715)

October–December 
 October 6 – George Frederick, Count of Erbach-Breuberg, Count of Erbach and Breuberg (1653) (d. 1653)
 October 15 – John Strangways, English politician (d. 1676)
 October 23 – Hedwig Eleonora of Holstein-Gottorp, queen consort of King Charles X of Sweden (d. 1715)
 October 31 – Ferdinand Maria, Elector of Bavaria, Wittelsbach ruler of Bavaria and an elector of the Holy Roman Empire (d. 1679)
 November 1 – Nicolas Boileau-Despréaux, French poet and critic (d. 1711)
 November 2 – Edward Colston, Bristol-born English slave trader (d. 1721)
 November 6
 Princess Catherine Beatrice of Savoy, daughter of the Duke of Savoy (d. 1637)
 Princess Henriette Adelaide of Savoy, wife of Ferdinand Maria (d. 1676)
 November 11 – Yan Ruoqu, Chinese scholar (d. 1704)
 November 14 – Pierre du Cambout de Coislin, French prelate (d. 1706)
 November 30
 Johannes Fabritius, Dutch painter (d. 1693)
 Adriaen van de Velde, Dutch painter (d. 1672)
 December 1 – Elizabeth Capell, Countess of Essex, British countess (d. 1718)
 December 23 – Gregório de Matos, Brazilian poet and lawyer (d. 1696)
 December 26 – Justine Siegemund, German writer (d. 1705)
 December 27 – William Whitelock, English gentleman, Member of Parliament (d. 1717)

date unknown 
 Mary Rowlandson, American author and captive during King Philip's War (d. 1711)
 George Etherege, English playwright (d. 1692)

Deaths 

 January 11 – Dodo Knyphausen, Swedish military leader (b. 1583)
 January 16 – Queen Inyeol, Korean royal consort (b. 1594)
 January 19 – Daniel Schwenter, German Orientalist (b. 1585)
 January 26 – Jean Hotman, Marquis de Villers-St-Paul, French diplomat (b. 1552)
 February 13 – Barbara Sophie of Brandenburg, duchess consort and later regent of Württemberg (b. 1584)
 February 16 – Tokuhime, Japanese noble (b. 1559)
 February 22 – Santorio Santorio, Italian physician (b. 1561)
 March 11 – Christoph Grienberger, Austrian astronomer (b. 1561)
 March 24 – Johanna Sibylla of Hanau-Lichtenberg, countess consort of Wied-Runkel and Isenburg (b. 1564)
 April 6 – Philipp Uffenbach, German artist (b. 1566)
 April 18 – Julius Caesar, English judge  (b. c.1557)
 April 23 – John Albert II, Duke of Mecklenburg (b. 1590)
 May 23 – Agatha Marie of Hanau, German noblewoman (b. 1599)
 June 7 – Frederik Coning, Dutch member of the Haarlem schutterij (b. 1594)
 June 9 – Antoine de Paule, French-born 56th Grandmaster of the Knights Hospitaller (b. c.1551)
 June 13 – George Gordon, 1st Marquess of Huntly, Scottish politician (b. 1562)
 June 21 – Justus de Harduwijn, Dutch Catholic priest and poet (b. 1582)
 June 27 – Date Masamune, Japanese daimyō (b. 1567)
 July – Elijah Loans, rabbi and kabbalist (b. 1555)
 July 20 – Albrycht Władysław Radziwiłł, Polish prince (b. 1589)
 August 6 – Countess Katharina of Hanau-Lichtenberg (b. 1568)
 August 8 – Simon Louis, Count of Lippe-Detmolt (1627–1636) (b. 1610)
 August 25 – Bhai Gurdas, Sikh religious figure (b. 1551)
 September 6 – Paul Stockmann, German hymnwriter (b. 1603)
 September 17 – Stefano Maderno, Italian sculptor (b. 1576)
 September 19 – Franz von Dietrichstein, German Catholic bishop (b. 1570)
 October 1 – Augustus the Elder, Duke of Brunswick-Lüneburg, Lutheran Bishop of Ratzeburg (b. 1568)
 October 11 – Johann Albrecht Adelgrief, German self-proclaimed prophet who was executed for witchcraft
 October 19
 Marcin Kazanowski, Polish military leader (b. c. 1564)
 Hugh Hamersley, Lord Mayor of London, England (1627–1628) (b. 1565)
 December 9
 Fabian Birkowski, Polish writer (b. 1566)
 Giovanni da San Giovanni, Italian painter (b. 1592)
 December 10 – Randal MacDonnell, 1st Earl of Antrim, Irish leader
 December 19 – William Spencer, 2nd Baron Spencer of Wormleighton, British baron (b. 1591)
 December 22 – Johannes Saeckma, Dutch Golden Age magistrate (b. 1572)
 December 27 – Iskandar Muda, Sultan of Aceh (b. 1583)
 date unknown – Euphrosina Heldina von Dieffenau; German-Swedish courtier
 Louise Bourgeois Boursier, French Royal midwife (b. 1563)

References 

 
Leap years in the Gregorian calendar